The Congressional Progressive Caucus (CPC) is a congressional caucus affiliated with the Democratic Party in the United States Congress. The CPC represents the most left-leaning faction of the Democratic Party. It was founded in 1991 and has grown since then.

As of the 118th United States Congress, the CPC has 101 members (99 voting Representatives, 1 non-voting Delegate, and 1 Senator), making it the largest ideological caucus in the Democratic Party (larger than the New Democrat Coalition) and the second largest ideological caucus overall (after the Republican Study Committee). The CPC is chaired by U.S. Representative Pramila Jayapal (D-WA).

History 
The CPC was established in 1991 by U.S. Representatives Ron Dellums (D-CA), Lane Evans (D-IL), Thomas Andrews (D-ME), Peter DeFazio (D-OR), Maxine Waters (D-CA) and Bernie Sanders (I-VT). Additional Representatives joined soon thereafter, including Major Owens (D-NY), Nydia Velázquez (D-NY), David Bonior (D-MI), Bob Filner (D-CA), Barney Frank (D-MA), Maurice Hinchey (D-NY), Jim McDermott (D-WA), Jerry Nadler (D-NY), Patsy Mink (D-HI), George Miller (D-CA), Pete Stark (D-CA), John Olver (D-MA), and Lynn Woolsey (D-CA). Sanders was the first CPC Chairman.

The founding CPC members were concerned about the economic hardship imposed by the deepening recession and the growing inequality brought about by the timidity of the Democratic Party response in the early 1990s. On January 3, 1995, at a standing room only news conference on Capitol Hill, they were the first group inside Congress to chart a comprehensive legislative alternative to U.S. Speaker Newt Gingrich and the Republican Contract with America. The CPC's ambitious agenda was framed as "The Progressive Promise: Fairness".

List of chairs

Policy positions 

The CPC advocates "a universal, high-quality, Medicare for All health care system for all", living wage laws, reductions in military expenditure, a crackdown on corporate greed, putting an end to mass incarceration, supporting and implementing swift measures to start reversing climate change, immigration policies that are humane, and reparations.

Economy
In April 2011, the CPC released a proposed "People's Budget" for fiscal year 2012. Two of its proponents stated: "By implementing a fair tax code, by building a resilient American economy, and by bringing our troops home, we achieve a budget surplus of over $30 billion by 2021 and we end up with a debt that is less than 65% of our GDP. This is what sustainability looks like".

In 2019, the Democratic-controlled House of Representatives passed H.R.582, The Raise the Wage Act, which would have gradually raised the minimum wage to $15 per hour. It was not taken up in the Republican-controlled Senate. In January 2021, Democrats in the Senate and House of Representatives reintroduced the bill. In February 2021, the Congressional Budget Office released a report on the Raise the Wage Act of 2021 which estimated that incrementally raising the federal minimum wage to $15 an hour by 2025 would benefit 17 million workers, but would  also reduce employment by 1.4 million people. On February 27, 2021, the Democratic-controlled House passed the American Rescue Plan pandemic relief package, which included a gradual minimum wage increase to $15 per hour. The measure was ultimately removed from the Senate version of the bill.

Health care
The Medicare for All Act is a bill first introduced in the United States House of Representatives by Representative John Conyers (D-MI) in 2003, with 38 co-sponsors. In 2019, the original 16-year-old proposal was renumbered, and Pramila Jayapal (D-WA) introduced a broadly similar, but more detailed, bill, HR 1384, in the 116th Congress. , it had 116 co-sponsors still in the House at the time, or 49.8% of House Democrats.

The act would establish a universal single-payer health care system in the United States, the rough equivalent of Canada's Medicare and Taiwan's Bureau of National Health Insurance, among other examples. Under a single-payer system, most medical care would be paid for by the federal government, ending the need for private health insurance and premiums, and re-casting private insurance companies as providing purely supplemental coverage, to be used when non-essential care is sought. The national system would be paid for in part through taxes replacing insurance premiums, but also by savings realized through the provision of preventive universal health care and the elimination of insurance company overhead and hospital billing costs. On September 13, 2017, Senator Bernie Sanders (I-VT) introduced a parallel bill in the United States Senate, with 16 co-sponsors. The act would establish a universal single-payer health care system in the United States.

In 2019, the CPC challenged House Speaker Nancy Pelosi regarding the details of a drug-pricing bill, the Elijah Cummings Lower Drug Costs Now Act. The final version was the result of extensive negotiations between House Democratic leadership and members of the CPC. The bill was introduced into the House of Representatives on September 19, 2019 during the 116th Congress by Rep. Frank Pallone (D-NJ). The bill received 106 co-sponsors. It passed the House on December 12, 2019, by a vote of (230-192). All Democrats voted for the measure, and all but 2 Republicans voted against it. The bill was then sent to the Senate. The Senate, having been controlled by Republicans, did not bring the bill up for a vote.

Abortion rights

During the 117th United States Congress congresswoman Judy Chu (CA-27) introduced the Women's Health Protection Act. The act would expand abortion rights and codify Roe v. Wade. It was introduced in response to the Texas Heartbeat Act. It passed House of Representatives (218–211), but was defeated in the Senate on a 46–48 vote in February 2022.

Climate change
A prominent 2019 attempt to get legislation passed for a Green New Deal was sponsored by Rep. Alexandria Ocasio-Cortez (D-NY) and Sen. Ed Markey (D-MA) during the 116th United States Congress, though it failed to advance in the Senate. Green New Deal proposals call for public policy to address climate change along with achieving other social aims like job creation and reducing economic inequality. The name refers back to the New Deal, a set of social and economic reforms and public works projects undertaken by President Franklin D. Roosevelt in response to the Great Depression. The Green New Deal combines Roosevelt's economic approach with modern ideas such as renewable energy and resource efficiency.

LGBT rights
In July 2022, the House Judiciary Committee Chairman Jerrold Nadler (D-NY), Senator Dianne Feinstein (D-CA), Congressional LGBTQ+ Equality Caucus Chairman David Cicilline (D-RI), Senator Tammy Baldwin (D-WI) and Senator Susan Collins (R-ME) announced the re-introduction of the Respect for Marriage Act, which was revised to include protections for interracial marriages to codify Loving v. Virginia. The Act passed the House (267–157) on July 19, 2022, with 47 Republicans joining all Democrats in voting in the affirmative.

The Senate considered the bill, but it was initially unclear if it would receive enough votes to end debate. On November 14, 2022, a group of bipartisan senators, including Rob Portman (R-OH), Kyrsten Sinema (D-AZ), Thom Tillis (R-NC), Tammy Baldwin (D-WI), and Susan Collins (R-ME) announced they had reached an amendment compromise to include language for religious protections and clarify that the bill did not legalize polygamous marriage. The amendment specifies that nonprofit religious organizations will not be required to provide services for the solemnization or celebration of a marriage. Shortly after, Senate Majority Leader Chuck Schumer announced the Respect for Marriage Act would be put up for a full vote.

On November 16, 2022, the Senate invoked cloture on the motion to proceed (62–37) to the amended bill. All 50 Democratic senators and 12 Republicans (Roy Blunt, Richard Burr, Shelley Moore Capito, Susan Collins, Joni Ernst, Cynthia Lummis, Lisa Murkowski, Rob Portman, Mitt Romney, Dan Sullivan, Thom Tillis, and Todd Young) voted in favor of advancing the bill. On November 29, 2022, the Senate voted 61–36 to pass the bill. Voting in favor of the bill were 49 Democrats and the same 12 Republicans who had voted to advance it. Two Republicans (Ben Sasse and Patrick Toomey) and one Democrat (Raphael Warnock, who co-sponsored the bill) did not vote.

2022 Russian invasion of Ukraine
In October 2022, 30 members of the caucus urged the Biden administration to seek a negotiated, diplomatic end to the Russian invasion of Ukraine while advocating for continued economic and military support to Ukraine.

The next day, after a wave of criticism, the letter was swiftly withdrawn on the basis that peaceful negotiations with Putin in current situation are "nearly impossible". Jayapal reasserted the Democrats' support for Ukraine and said the letter had been drafted several months ago and "released by staff without vetting."

Electoral results

Membership 

All members are Democrats or caucus with the Democratic Party. In the 118th Congress, there are 101 declared Progressives, including 99 voting Representatives, one non-voting member and one Senator.

Senate members

House members

Notes

See also
 Democratic Socialists of America
 Factions in the Democratic Party (United States)
 Progressive Democrats of America
 Progressivism in the United States

References

External links 

Official website of Progressive Caucus PAC
CPC in C-SPAN video library

Progressive
Democratic Party (United States) organizations
Progressivism in the United States
Progressive organizations in the United States
Organizations established in 1991
Social democratic organizations
1991 establishments in Washington, D.C.
Factions in the Democratic Party (United States)